Mighty Sounds is a ska and punk rock festival in the Czech Republic. The festival first took place in 2005, in the village of Olší near Opařany, remaining at that location for its first five years, before moving to a disused airport in Tábor in 2010. In 2007 the festival attracted around 10,000 people, and in 2010 its attendance exceeded 12,000 people, making it one of the biggest festivals of its kind in Europe.

Festival 
The festival is held over three days. Originally the festival featured one large stage and a second smaller one, plus a theatre tent. Another smaller tent known as the "Sado maso stage" featured techno and drum'n'bass DJs. After heavy rain in 2009 festival site and a nearby campsite for visitors was damaged by mud, and the owner of the site did not renew the contract for next event. Mighty Sounds moved to an unused grass-covered airfield in Tábor for the 2010 event. The festival subsequently featured two large stages, called the Jan Hus and Jan Zizka stages. Other stages include: a Theater tent, where less-known bands perform; the Radio 1 stage, which features electronic music DJs; and the Rudeboy Rhythm stage, which features DJs playing older ska, reggae, rocksteady and punk music. The festival also features a u-ramp for skateboarders and BMX riders, workshops, and special events, alongside normal festival amenities.

Lineups

See also
List of punk rock festivals
List of reggae festivals

References

External links

 Official last.fm

Rock festivals in the Czech Republic
Reggae festivals
Punk rock festivals
Music festivals established in 2005
Ska festivals
Summer events in the Czech Republic